William Barrett may refer to:

William Barrett (consul) (died 1584), English consul at Aleppo
William Barrett (antiquarian) (1733–1789), English surgeon and antiquary
William F. Barrett (1844–1925), English physicist
William Lewis Barrett (1847–1927), British flautist and music teacher
William N. Barrett (1855–1916), American politician from Oregon
William Emerson Barrett (1858–1906), U.S. Representative from Massachusetts
William H. Barrett (1866–1941), United States federal judge
William Alexander Barrett, English church composer and author of the 1891 songbook English Folk Songs; see "Fathom the Bowl"
William Daniel Barrett (1878–1953), New Zealand tribal leader, land court agent and trust board secretary
William Barrett (priest) (1880–1956), British-Australian Anglican Dean of Brisbane
William A. Barrett (1896–1976), U.S. Representative from Pennsylvania
William Edmund Barrett (1900–1986), American writer
William Barrett (philosopher) (1913–1992), American philosopher and critic
W. S. Barrett (1914–2001), English classical scholar
Bill Barrett (1929–2016), U.S. Representative from Nebraska

See also
Bill Barrett (disambiguation)
William Barratt (1823–1889), English convert to Mormonism
William Barratt (manufacturer) (1877–1939), British shoe manufacturer
William Cross Barratt (1862–1940), British Army and British Indian Army officer
William Barret ( 1579–1595), English divine
William Barret (died 1871), American businessman
William E. Berrett (1902–1993), writer and educator